Bartki may refer to the following places:
Bartki, Podlaskie Voivodeship (north-east Poland)
Bartki, Braniewo County in Warmian-Masurian Voivodeship (north Poland)
Bartki, Nidzica County in Warmian-Masurian Voivodeship (north Poland)
Bartki, Olecko County in Warmian-Masurian Voivodeship (north Poland)
Bartki, Ostróda County in Warmian-Masurian Voivodeship (north Poland)